East Ogwell is a village and former civil parish  south of Exeter, now in the parish of Ogwell, in the Teignbridge district, in the county of Devon, England. In 2018 it had an estimated population of 855. In 1891 the parish had a population of 271.

Amenities 
East Ogwell has a church called St Bartholomew located in the centre of the village.

History 
The name "Ogwell" means 'Wocga's spring/stream'. The "East" part distinguishing it from West Ogwell. East Ogwell was recorded in the Domesday Book as Ogewille. On 1 April 1894 the parish was abolished and merged with West Ogwell to form Ogwell. A branch  of the ancient Reynell family, who  became the  Reynell Baronets, lived here for centuries.

References 

Villages in Devon
Former civil parishes in Devon
Teignbridge